Berengarra School is a school in  the suburb of Box Hill North, Melbourne, Victoria, Australia. Berengarra School is a specialist independent secondary school for students in Years 7–12. The school is non-denominational and co-educational for students with social and emotional challenges.. Berengarra provides innovative educational programmes to meet the individual needs of these students, who have a variety of social and emotional problems.

The school has a new program called Pathways in Chadstone which offers a transitional program to students moving into apprenticeships and areas of further Technical and further education.

References
The Berengarra School Website

Educational institutions established in 1977
Private schools in Melbourne
Special schools in Australia
1977 establishments in Australia